Mr. Madras is a 1995 Indian Tamil language comedy film directed by P. Vasu. The film stars Prabhu, Sukanya and Vineetha. It was released on 8 September 1995, and emerged a box-office bomb.

Plot 

Aruna Arunachalam is an estate owner in Ooty who is in trouble with Thiruttani, who keeps illegally some hectares of her estate. Murugan won the Mr. Madras award and also worked as a model. His mother advised him to find a decent job. He is later appointed by Aruna to protect her, and she promises to keep him permanently. Aruna has two granddaughters: Meera and Devi. Murugan investigates in Thiruttani's area and he finds Ganja plantation happening in there. Murugan then shows the proof to the police and they arrest Thiruttani. Although Murugan accomplishes his mission, Aruna dismisses him. So Murugan takes challenge to continue to work here. Murugan makes things rough on Aruna's family. Murugan's mother is worried about her son, so she comes there and faints after seeing Aruna. Murugan's mother is actually Aruna's daughter. In the past Murugan's mother married a poor laborer and Aruna didn't accept it. Meera and Devi fall in love with Murugan. Murugan makes a big drama to reduce Aruna's ego. In the meantime, Thiruttani escapes from jail and kidnaps Aruna. Murugan saves his grandmother and Aruna apologizes to her daughter.

Cast 

Prabhu as Murugan alias Mr. Madras
Sukanya as Meera
Vineetha as Devi
Manorama as Aruna Arunachalam
Lakshmi as Janaki
Anandaraj as Thiruttani
Goundamani as Govindsamy
Senthil as Ponnusamy
R. Sundarrajan as Aruna's son
Kavitha as Mahalakshmi Meera and Devi's Mother 
Kaka Radhakrishnan as Arunachalam
Gandhimathi as Alamelu a serial actress
Thyagu as a police constable
Santhana Bharathi as a police inspector

Soundtrack 
The soundtrack were composed by Vidyasagar. The soundtrack, released in 1995, features 6 tracks with lyrics written by Vaali.

References

External links 
 

1990s Tamil-language films
Films directed by P. Vasu
1995 comedy films
1995 films
Films scored by Vidyasagar
Films shot in Ooty
Indian comedy films